The Ministry of Higher Education and Scientific Research is a cabinet ministry of Yemen.

List of ministers 

 Khaled Al-Wasabi (18 December 2020 – present)
 Mohamed al-Mutaher (2014–2015)
 Hesham Sharf (2011 -)

See also 
Cabinet of Yemen
Politics of Yemen

References 

Government ministries of Yemen